Elections to the National Assembly of France were held in Algeria on 20 February 1876 as part of the wider National Assembly elections. At that time, Algeria had three representatives in the National Assembly.

Results

 Lambert died on 22 January 1877. In the second round of a by-election to replace him, held on 26 April 1877, Gaston Thomson was elected with 2,963 votes against 2,654 for Fawiter (a Radical) and 2,530 for Treille.

See also
 1876 French legislative election

References

Elections in Algeria
1876
1876 in Algeria
1876 elections in Africa
1876 in France